Events from the year 1754 in Russia

Incumbents
 Monarch – Elizabeth

Events

 Anichkov Palace
  Transfiguration Cathedral (Saint Petersburg)
 Nizhnyaya Tura
 Oleksandriia

Births

 Unknown date - Alexandra Branitskaya, political activist, courtier and businessperson (d. 1838)

Deaths

References

1754 in Russia
Years of the 18th century in the Russian Empire